Leventhal is a surname. Notable people with the surname include:

 Adam Leventhal (born 1979), British sportscaster
 Alan Leventhal (born 1953), chairman and chief executive officer of Beacon Capital Partners, Boston, Massachusetts
 Harold Leventhal (1915–1979), United States Circuit Judge
 Harold Leventhal (1919–2005), American music manager
 John Leventhal (born 1952), Grammy award-winning-guitarist, composer and music producer
 Norman B. Leventhal (1917–2015), chairman of The Beacon Companies
 Rick Leventhal (born 1960), American journalist, Fox News senior correspondent
 Stan Leventhal (1951-1995), American author

de:Leventhal